The Mercedes MGP W02 is a Formula One racing car, the second car designed and built by Mercedes Grand Prix after buying 2009 World Constructors' Champions Brawn GP. The car was driven by seven-time World Drivers' Champion Michael Schumacher and Nico Rosberg in the 2011 Formula One season. The car was unveiled at the Circuit Ricardo Tormo in Valencia, Spain on 1 February 2011. Two days before the car was unveiled, Mercedes released a render of the car showing a more traditional approach to the airbox than the one Mercedes used on the MGP W01 chassis and a darker silver livery. Both Schumacher and Rosberg drove the car on the first day of the Valencia tests.

As of 2022, the Mercedes MGP W02 is the only Mercedes F1 car that failed to score a podium finish.

Complete Formula One results
(key) (results in bold indicate pole position; results in italics indicate fastest lap)

References

External links

MGP W02